Marie-Alexandrine Mathieu (1838-1908) was a French artist known for her etchings. 

Her work is included in the collections of the National Gallery of Canada, the National Gallery of Australia and the Petit Palais, Paris.

References

19th-century French women artists
20th-century French women artists
1838 births
1908 deaths